= Belle Fiore Winery =

Winery in Oregon, US

Coordinates: 42.196169°N 122.641208°W

- Logo
- Location: Ashland, Oregon, United States
- Website: bellefiorewine.com

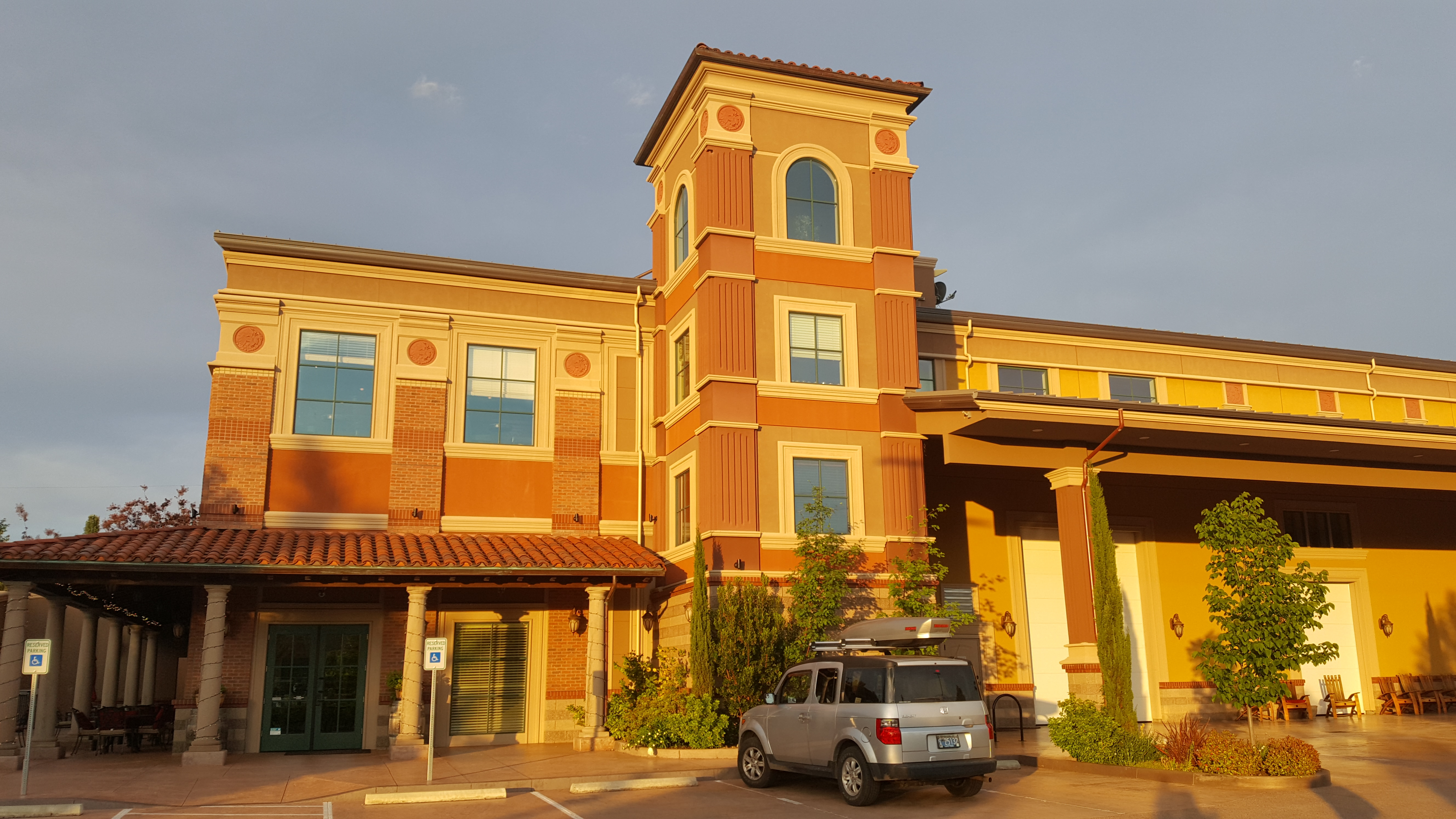
Tasting room exterior, 2019

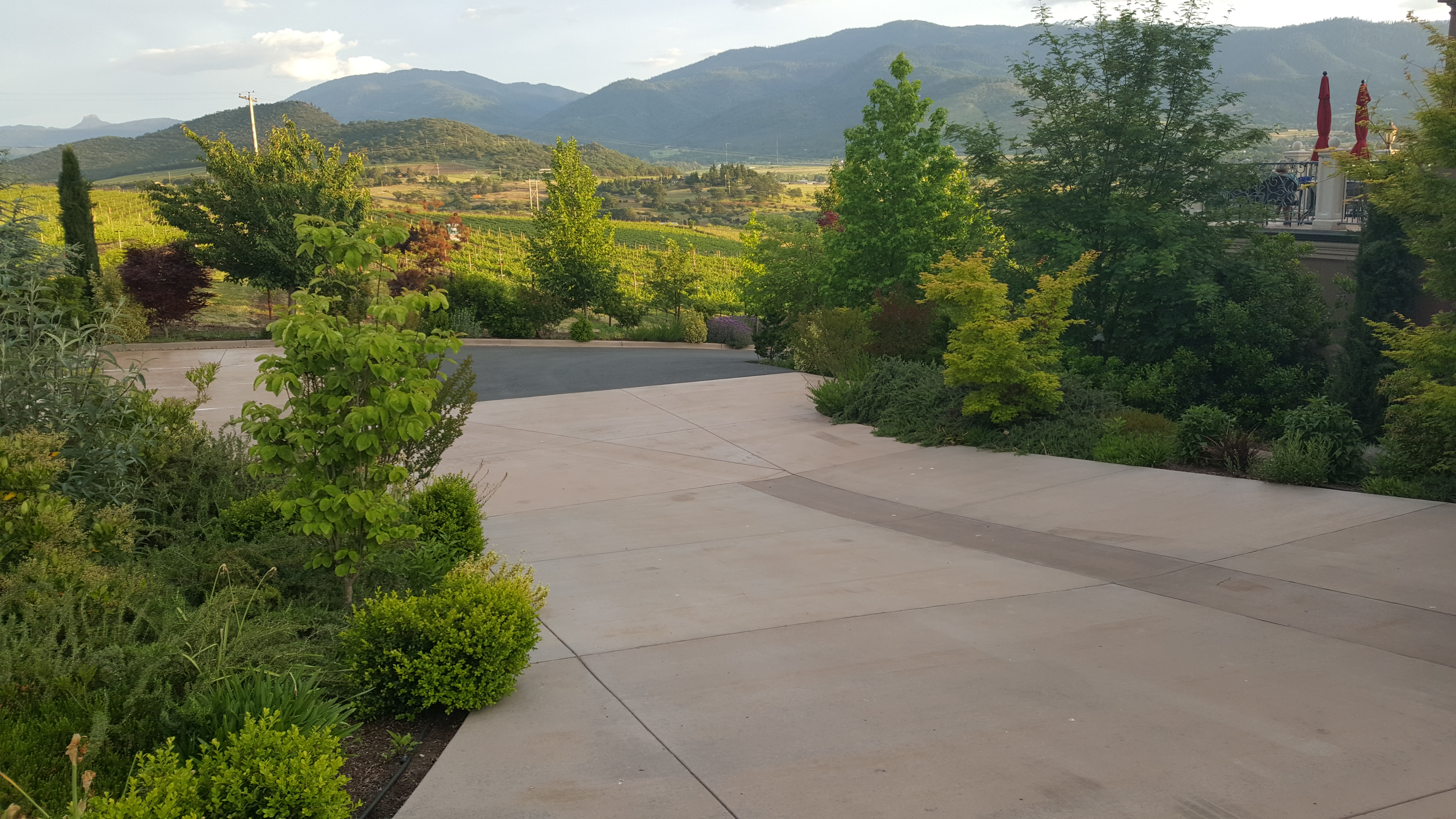
The winery's ground in 2019

Belle Fiore Winery is a winery located off Dead Indian Memorial Road in Ashland, Oregon, United States. The 58-acre (23 ha) property features an Italian-style wine pavilion and a 19,045-square-foot French-inspired mansion built by Edward Kerwin in 2004. Kerwin remains the owner and manager as of 2019.

Belle Fiore was recognized at the 2015 Oregon Wine Experience. The winery earned several gold and double gold medals at the 2019 San Francisco Chronicle Wine Competition. Belle Fiore's 2015 Terramisso Tempranillo earned a gold medal at the 28th annual Indy International Wine Competition (2019).

In 2016, Kerwin was cited and fined by the county for "operating a restaurant without approval and not using prepackaged foods as required by land-use statutes governing wineries on rural farmland". He was in a seven-year legal dispute with neighboring Ashland Gun and Archery Club until 2019.
